Theodosius Romanus was the Patriarch of Antioch and head of the Syriac Orthodox Church from 887 until his death in 896.

Biography
Romanus was born at Tikrit in the 9th century and became a monk at the monastery of Qartmin in Tur Abdin. He was educated in medicine and became known as a skilful physician. His nickname, "the Roman" (Romanus), was derived from his knowledge of Greek. At this time, the patriarchal office had lain vacant for four years after the death of Ignatius II in 883 due to disagreement amongst the church's bishops. In response to the demands of their congregants, the bishops assembled at Amida to deliberate and hold an election by lot in which twelve names were put forward.

Romanus was thus chosen to succeed Ignatius II as patriarch of Antioch, and was consecrated at Amida on 5 February 887 (AG 1198) by Timothy, archbishop of Samosata, upon which he assumed the name Theodosius. No details of Theodosius' tenure as patriarch are known, except that he had some buildings constructed at the monastery of Qartmin with Ezekiel, bishop of Tur Abdin. He served as patriarch of Antioch until his death on 1 June 896 (AG 1207) at the monastery of Qartmin, where he was buried. As patriarch, Theodosius ordained thirty-two bishops, as per Michael the Syrian's Chronicle, whereas Bar Hebraeus in his Ecclesiastical History credits Theodosius with the ordination of thirty-three bishops.

Works
Theodosius translated and commented on the Book of Hierotheos at the request of Lazarus, bishop of Cyrrhus. His commentary consisted of five books in three treatises, of which the first two treatises were completed at Amida, whilst the third was finished at Samosata. Although the book had been deemed heretical and repudiated by the Patriarch Quriaqos of Tagrit as the work of Stephen Bar Sudhaile in a canonical statement at a synod, Theodosius seems to have accepted its authenticity and makes no mention of Stephen. Theodosius' positive opinion of the book has been noted to reflect the tradition of mysticism prevalent at the monastery of Qartmin. Theodosius' commentary was later used by Bar Hebraeus in his own commentary on the book, and was also recopied by Abu Nasr of Bartella in 1290 in a manuscript entitled On The Hidden Mysteries of the House of God, but only contained half of the commentary (Za'faran MS. 213).

Other surviving works include a medical syntagma ("compendium") attributed to Theodosius, as noted by Bar Hebraeus, of which only a fragment survives (Vatican MS. 192). In addition, a synodical epistle to Pope Michael III of Alexandria and a homily for Lent, both of which are in Arabic, is preserved (Brit. Mus. MS. 7206). He also wrote a treatise for the deacon George in which he compiled and explained one hundred and twelve maxims ("symbolic sayings of wise men"), most of which were of Pythagorean origin that he had translated from Greek into Syriac; a copy of this treatise in Syriac and Arabic still survives (Paris MS. 157). A few canons were later also attributed to Theodosius.

Episcopal succession
As patriarch, Theodosius ordained the following bishops:

Athanasius, archbishop of Tikrit
Job, archbishop of Herat
Dionysius, archbishop of Apamea
Cyril, archbishop of Anazarbus
Dionysius, bishop of Tella
Ezekiel, bishop of Melitene
Daniel, archbishop of Damascus
Denha, bishop of Callisura
George, bishop of Circesium
Gabriel, archbishop of Tiberias
Michael, archbishop of Mabbogh
Jacob, archbishop of Samosata
Ignatius, archbishop of Aphrah
Ezekiel, bishop of Tur Abdin
Silvanus, bishop of Arzen
Basil, bishop of Armenia
John, bishop of Irenopolis
Habib, archbishop of Anazarbus
Simeon, bishop of Tell Besme
Habib, archbishop of Resafa
John, bishop of Sarug
Lazarus, archbishop of Tarsus
Elias, bishop of Gisra
Habib, bishop of Kaishum
Basil, bishop of Zeugma
Matthew, bishop of Tella
Thomas, bishop of Circesium
Thomas, bishop of Irenopolis
Severus, bishop of Dara
Jacob, bishop of the Najranites
Habib, bishop of Irenopolis
Sergius, bishop of Reshʿayna

References

Bibliography

9th-century Oriental Orthodox archbishops
Syriac Patriarchs of Antioch from 512 to 1783
Year of birth unknown
896 deaths
Greek–Syriac translators
Upper Mesopotamia under the Abbasid Caliphate
9th-century people from the Abbasid Caliphate
Christianity in the Abbasid Caliphate
People from Tikrit
9th-century physicians
9th-century Syriac-language writers
9th-century Arabic writers
9th-century births